The Brasserie Caracole is a Belgian artisanal brewery based in Falmignoul (near Dinant) that is known to warm the water with a wood-fired oven.  The bottling and labelling are done manually.

The brewery was already existing in 1766 under the name Brasserie Moussoux, then changed its name Brasserie Lamotte in 1941 and was finally taken over in 1992 to become the Brasserie Caracole.

Beers
It produces 5 different beers:
Caracole, a strong blond beer (8% ABV)
Saxo, an amber beer (8% ABV)
Nostradamus (9.5% ABV)
Troublette (5% ABV)
Troublette bio (5% ABV), an organic beer

References
 A reported visit of the brewery
 Beerme.com

Caracole
Companies based in Namur (province)
Dinant